Big Wheel is the seventh and final studio album by the Australian rock synthpop band, Icehouse, released on 25 October 1993 in Australia by dIVA Records – founder Iva Davies' own label – and Massive Records. It was recorded at Davies' home in Whale Beach during 1993 with Davies on vocals, guitar, bass guitar and keyboards, David Chapman on guitar, keyboards and backing vocals, and Paul Wheeler on drums, percussion and backing vocals. Big Wheel peaked at #44 and was their first studio album not to reach the Top Ten on the Australian album charts. The album was digitally remastered by Davies and Ryan Scott with five bonus tracks added for the 2002 re-release by Warner Music Australia.

Reception 
Reviewed in Rolling Stone Australia at the time of release, Big Wheel was described as tougher-sounding and less commercial than the band's previous releases, and arguably their best recording to date. The reviewer noted the "early-Seventies glam and Enoesque atmospherics" and praised the "sonic immediacy" of the "largely live performances".

Track listing 
All songs written by Iva Davies, David Chapman and Paul Wheeler except where noted. Songwriters according to Australasian Performing Right Association (APRA).

Personnel 
Credited to:

Icehouse
 Iva Davies – vocals, guitar, bass guitar, keyboards
 David Chapman – guitar, keyboards, backing vocals
 Paul Wheeler – drums, percussion, backing vocals.

Additional musicians
 Ben Nightingale – guitar on "Sam the Man".

Production
 Producer – Iva Davies
 Studios – dIVA Studios at Whale Beach, Australia. Additional recordings by Simon Leadley at Trackdown Studios assisted by James Cadsky, Richard Mould, Michelle Barry.
 Mix, editing and mastering – David Lord with Iva Davies, David Chapman, Paul Wheeler at Trackdown
 Mix, editing and mastering engineered by Simon Leadley at Trackdown.

Design
 Cover concept – Iva Davies
 Artwork and computer graphics – Patti Gaines for Genki.
 Photography – Tony Mott.

Charts

References 

1993 albums
Icehouse (band) albums